

Carl Ulrich Ernst Paul Anders (31 August 1893 – 28 January 1972) was a German general in the Wehrmacht of Nazi Germany during World War II who commanded several infantry divisions.  He was a recipient of the Knight's Cross of the Iron Cross of Nazi Germany.

Anders surrendered to the Red Army in the course of the Soviet 1945 Vistula–Oder Offensive. Convicted as a war criminal in the Soviet Union, he was held until 1955.

Awards and decorations

 Wehrmacht Long Service Award
 Clasp to the Iron Cross (1939) 2nd Class (25 September 1939) & 1st Class (26 October 1939)
 German Cross in Gold on 14 February 1942 as Oberstleutnant in Infanterie-Regiment 484
 Knight's Cross of the Iron Cross on 4 May 1944 as Oberst and commander of Infanterie-Regiment 484

References

Citations

Bibliography

 
 
 

1893 births
1972 deaths
People from Vorpommern-Rügen
People from the Province of Pomerania
German Army officers of World War II
Major generals of the German Army (Wehrmacht)
German Army personnel of World War I
Prussian Army personnel
Recipients of the Gold German Cross
Recipients of the clasp to the Iron Cross, 1st class
Recipients of the Knight's Cross of the Iron Cross
German prisoners of war in World War II held by the Soviet Union